The  in Koganei Park, Tokyo, Japan, is a museum of historic Japanese buildings.

The park includes many buildings from the ordinary middle class Japanese experience to the homes of wealthy and powerful individuals such as former Prime Minister Takahashi Korekiyo, out in the open in a park.

The museum enables visitors to enter and explore a wide variety of buildings of different styles, periods, and purposes, from upper-class homes to pre-war shops, public baths (sentō), and Western-style buildings of the Meiji period, which would normally be inaccessible to tourists or other casual visitors, or which cannot be found in Tokyo.

Acclaimed animator Hayao Miyazaki often visited here during the creation of his film, Spirited Away, for inspiration.

Restored buildings 

The park is divided into three zones. The west zone is lined with Musashino farm homes and Yamanote houses, the center zone is lined with prestigious historic buildings, and the east zone is a reproduction of the downtown area.

Center Zone 
It was relocated to this area in 1941 after the ceremony.
Former Jishōin Mausoleum (1652): A mausoleum building built by Kōra Muneyoshi, a master builder of the Shogunate, built in 1652 in the early Edo period. Third Shogun Tokugawa Iemitsu's concubine  (great-granddaughter of Ishida Mitsunari) was enshrined. Designated Tangible Cultural Property (building) of the Tokyo Metropolitan Government.
House of Takahashi Korekiyo (1902): The residence of Takahashi Korekiyo, a politician who was assassinated in February 26 Incident. Completed in 1902 (Meiji 35).  Made entirely of Tsuga. This is an early example of using window glass in a Japanese-style mansion. Korekiyo was assassinated on the second floor of this building.
Nishikawa Annex (1922): A secondhouse of Izaemon Nishikawa, the founder of Nishikawa Silk Reeling, used as a guesthouse and retreat. Completed in 1922 (Taisho 11).
Date Family Gate (Taisho era (1912–1926): The front gate of a mansion built by the Date Marquis family (formerly the Date family of the Uwajima Domain) in Shirokane Sankocho during the Taisho era . It is built in the style of a daimyo mansion with a one-sided office.

West Zone 
Tokiwadai Photo Studio- A photo studio built in Tokiwadai, a suburban residential area in the early Showa period . It has a large glass surface on the north side and is designed to allow indirect light to enter.
Mitsui Hachirōemon Residence- A Japanese-style residence of the Mitsui Zaibatsu family, which was relocated from Kyoto to Azabu, Minato-ku after the end of World War II. A tangible cultural property (building) designated by the Tokyo Metropolitan Government.
Takakura in Amami - A grain storehouse built in Uken Village, Amami Ōshima, around the end of the Edo period. In the Takakura style, the thatched roof is used as a storage.
Yoshinoya (farm house) - A farm house in Nozaki Village, Tama County (多摩郡) (currently Nozaki, Mitaka City) in the late Edo period. The interior reproduces the life of around 1955.
Hachioji Sennin Concentric (八王子千人同心) Kumigashira House- The mansion of the late Edo period Kumigashira (郷士). It has a higher style than ordinary private houses, such as a tatami room with an alcove and an entrance with a ceremony table.
Kunio Maekawa House - modern architecture house of Kunio Maekawa is 1942 Jitei was built in [2] . While keeping the building area small under the building control during the war, the living room with a colonnade and the second floor in a loft style are arranged in the center of the large roof. A tangible cultural property (building) designated by the Tokyo Metropolitan Government.
Den-en-chōfu House (Okawa House) --A Western-style suburban house built in the suburbs that was developed under the ideal of "Garden City". There is a pergola on the clapboard outer wall and terrace . Designed by Michio Mitsui, who was in Okada Shinichirō's office .
Tsunashima family (farm house)-A valuable mid-Edo period farmhouse in Okamoto, Setagaya.
Koide House-A house designed by architect Sutemi Horiguchi immediately after returning from Europe. It is a Japanese-Western style mixed house in the early days, with a large roof like a quadrangular pyramid and a horizontal eaves. A tangible cultural property (building) designated by the Tokyo Metropolitan Government.
De Lalande House - Shinjuku Shinanomachi (信濃町) there to the Western Museum. It was a one-story building that was said to have been designed by meteorologist and physicist Kitao Jiro as his own residence, but around 1910, it was extensively expanded to a three-story wooden building by the German architect Georg de Lalande. It was restored assuming the appearance of [8] . For the convenience of barrier-free, an external elevator to the 2nd floor is installed.

East Zone 
Tenmei family (farm house) - A prestigious farm house with a Nagayamon (traditional Japanese gate style, 長屋門), where a wealthy farmer lived from the Edo period.
Odera Shoyu Store-A merchant house made of girders. They sold sake, miso, and soy sauce by weight. The inside of the store reproduces the situation in the latter half of the Showa 30's.
Kagiya (Izakaya)-A popular izakaya in Shitaya, Taitō-ku (built in 1856).
Kodakara-yu- A Sentō (public bathhouse) built in a palace in Senju, Adachi-ku ( built in 1929).
Tailor-A townhouse made of girders. The interior recreates the workplace of a tailor in the Taisho era.
Takei Sanshodou (Stationery Store) --A stationery store in Kanda. Signboard architecture.　
Flower City Flower Shop-A flower shop in Kanda. Signboard architecture. Reliefs are applied to the copper plate of the façade.
Manseibashi alternating - Manseibashi of the foot, the former Manseibashi Station near to there was brick of alternating. The year of completion is unknown, but it is estimated to be in the late Meiji era.
Uemura House- A copper-plated signboard in Shintomicho.
Maruji Shoten (Rough goods store)-A rough goods store in Kanda Jimbocho (daily necessities store). Signboard architecture. The façade is finished with a copper plate using the Edo Komon pattern.
Murakami Seikado (cosmetics store) -A booth store in Ikenohata. Signboard architecture. The appearance that combines the Ionic order- style colonnades and the tile-roofed Japanese-style roof is unique.
Kawano Shoten (Japanese umbrella wholesaler) --A Japanese umbrella manufacturing wholesaler with a girder structure.
Yamatoya Main Store (Dry Food Store)-A three-story wooden store in Shirokanedai, Minato-ku.
Mantoku Ryokan- A ryokan located along the Ōme Kaidō in Nishiwake-cho, Ōme City. The building has been restored to its original appearance, and the interior has been restored to its appearance around 1950.

Outdoor exhibit 
Toei 7500 series train No. 7514 - 1962 of manufacturing Tokyo Toden tram (scrapped in 1978). Since it was not remodeled into a one-person operation, it retains its original shape at the time of manufacture.
Bonnet bus Isuzu TSD43 ( dynamics saved ) - 1968 formula, Kitamura Mfg body. Originally used by the Japan Air Self-Defense Force, it used to be a Toei bus paint that was changed when the movie appeared, but now it is the same cream paint as the Toden. Privately owned. Since it is a sightseeing vehicle limited to running in the park, it does not have a license plate. Although the park was operated on holidays (drivers and conductors may wear the uniforms of the Japanese National Railways on board), it is not operating as of 2011 due to maintenance problems such as aging.
Imperial Palace Main Gate Ishibashi Ornamental Lamp-One of the six ornamental lamps installed on the parapet of the Imperial Palace Main Gate Ishibashi (on the front side of the Nijūbashi bridge). Manufactured around 1886 (Meiji 20). Due to aging, a lamp of the same shape was manufactured and replaced in 1986 (Showa 61). The same thing is exhibited in the Meiji-mura museum.
Ueno Fire Station (former Shimotani Fire Station) Watchtower Upper part-The watchtower (Fire lookout tower) used from 1925 (Taisho 14) to 1970 (Showa 45 ). The upper 7m of the total height of 23.6m has been relocated.
Noonday Gun- A cannon that was placed at the site of the former Honmaru in the Imperial Palace and fired a blank gun (noon gun) that signals noon. It was used until it was switched to a siren in 1929 (Showa 4).

See also 
 Meiji Mura, an open-air architectural museum/theme park in Inuyama, near Nagoya in Aichi prefecture

References

External links

 
 Japan guide information
 unofficial video of the park — and accessible gateway to J google.

Museums in Tokyo
Architecture museums in Japan
Open-air museums in Japan
Koganei, Tokyo
Museums established in 1993
1993 establishments in Japan